Desde el Comienzo: 1994–2004 is a compilation of greatest hits released by the Puerto Rican rock band Fiel a la Vega in 2005.

The album includes ten songs taken from the band's four previous studio albums, including a re-recording of the band's hit "El Wanabí". It also includes the song "Canción para Vieques", a song written by band frontman Tito Auger featuring several artists, recorded during the Navy-Vieques protests. Two new songs close the album's track listing.

Track listing
 "Salimos de Aquí" – 6:33
 "Las Flores de Emilio" – 6:11
 "El Panal" – 5:10
 "Bla, Bla, Bla" – 3:44
 "Al Frente" – 5:06
 "Cancion en la Arena" – 6:33
 "Solamente" – 5:22
 "La Prosperidad" – 6:08
 "Hay que Edificar" – 4:53
 "El Wanabi" – 5:56
 "Cancion para Vieques" – 5:31
 "La Banda se ha escapado" – 4:10
 "Oda a la Fidelidad" – 11:11

Personnel
 Tito Auger - lead vocals, acoustic guitar, harmonica
 Ricky Laureano - lead and acoustic guitar, vocals, cuatro
 Jorge Arraiza - bass guitar, vocals, keyboards, percussion
 Pedro Arraiza - drums, harmonica
 Papo Román - percussion

Fiel a la Vega albums
2005 greatest hits albums